Graham C. Ousey is an American sociologist and criminologist. He is a professor of sociology at the College of William & Mary, where he is also the chair of the sociology department. He is known for researching immigration and crime.

References

External links
Faculty page
Home page

College of William & Mary faculty
Living people
American criminologists
Radford University alumni
Louisiana State University alumni
Year of birth missing (living people)